The Canadian Perinatal Network (CPN) is made up of Canadian researchers who collaborate on research issues relating to perinatal care. The network commenced in September 2005, and includes members from 25 tertiary perinatal units. CPN will enable health care professionals, researchers, and administrators to participate actively in clinical, epidemiologic, health services, health policy, and informatics research aimed at improving the effectiveness and efficiency of perinatal care.

Primary Goals
The primary goals of CPN are:
 Joint examination of the whole spectrum of risks and their interactions, from the antenatal and obstetric to the neonatal periods, on maternal and perinatal outcomes
 Iterative hypothesis testing and acquisition of new knowledge about obstetric practices associated with good or poor maternal and perinatal outcomes, which will inform the care of women and babies in Canada
 Longitudinal monitoring of obstetric practices and resource use known to be associated with a decrease in adverse events, which will inform knowledge transfer activities
 Longitudinal monitoring of outcomes and resource use, which will be important for auditing quality of care and providing information that is critical to planning of care and resource allocation.

CPN centres
CPN comprises the following hospital sites:

Victoria General Hospital, Victoria, BC
BC Women's Hospital & Health Centre, Vancouver, BC
Royal Columbian Hospital, New Westminster, BC
Foothills Medical Centre, Calgary, AB
Royal Alexandra Hospital, Edmonton, AB
Royal University Hospital, Saskatoon, SK
Regina General Hospital, Regina, SK
The Women's Hospital, Winnipeg, MB
Kingston General Hospital, Kingston, ON
McMaster University Medical Centre, Hamilton, ON
Saint Joseph's Health Centre, London, ON
Mount Sinai Hospital, Toronto, ON
Sunnybrook Health Sciences Centre, Toronto, ON
The Ottawa Hospital, Ottawa, ON
Royal Victoria Hospital, Montréal, QC
Centre hospitalier universitaire de Sherbrooke, Sherbrooke, QC
Centre hospitalier universitaire de Québec, Québec City, QC
IWK Health Centre, Halifax, NS
Women's Health Program, Eastern Health, St. John's, NL
Saint John Regional Hospital, Saint John, NB
Hôpital Sainte-Justine, Montréal, QC
St. Boniface General Hospital, Winnipeg, MB
Windsor Regional Hospital, Windsor, ON
Dr. Everett Chalmers Regional Hospital, Fredericton, NB
The Moncton Hospital, Moncton, NB

BILBO: birth before 29 weeks: interventions leading to better outcomes for mothers and babies
The inaugural project of CPN was BILBO (Birth before 29 weeks: Interventions Leading to Better Outcomes for mothers and babies). BILBO built a standardized national database of pregnancies at high risk of very preterm birth at 220 to 28+6 weeks gestation.
In Canada, more than 350,000 babies are born each year. Preterm birth complicates 7.6% of births, with variations of ±15% between provinces. Preterm birth is the most important cause of perinatal mortality and morbidity, and is recognized to hold the greatest potential for improvement of health outcomes.
BILBO ObjectivesIn women at risk of very preterm birth at 220 – 28+6 weeks gestation, CPN sought to identify obstetric practices that may be associated with good maternal or perinatal outcomes. The Network's specific objectives were: 
 To examine variations in outcomes and practices for the major causes of spontaneous and indicated very preterm birth among Canadian tertiary perinatal units; 
 To identify obstetric practices that are associated with favourable and unfavourable outcomes for further intervention studies of the major causes of very preterm birth, after correction for pregnancy (maternal and fetal) characteristics [and for perinatal outcomes, neonatal risk markers and neonatal intensive care practices]; and 
 To study variations in resource use associated with obstetric practice and tertiary perinatal characteristics, after adjustment for baseline population risks.

The research
The CPN team includes content and methods experts in each of the major causes of spontaneous or indicated very preterm birth, epidemiology, database design/maintenance, national networks, medical informatics, and statistical modelling.
This project involves 24 tertiary perinatal units across Canada and focus on the major determinants of spontaneous and indicated very preterm birth (at 22+0–28+6 weeks): spontaneous preterm labour, shortened cervix, prolapsing membranes, preterm prelabour rupture of membranes, intrauterine growth restriction (abdominal circumference), gestational hypertension (with/without proteinuria), and antepartum haemorrhage. Data collection proceeds from the maternal and neonatal/infant/paediatric records, and include adverse perinatal and maternal outcomes, patient mix (including maternal demographics, past medical/obstetric history, characteristics of current pregnancy), neonatal care (for perinatal outcomes), and specific key obstetric practices (including maternal transport, cervical cerclage, amnioinfusion, fetal and maternal surveillance, pharmacological and non-pharmacological therapy, and pregnancy prolongation).

Research Goals
 Determine crude outcome incidence rates among centres. 
 Examine variations in outcomes and practices among tertiary perinatal units, using staged multivariate logistic and linear regression analysis.
 Associate obstetric practice differences with outcomes variation.
 Compare crude measures of resource use.
 Analyze resource use variation among centres.

Relevance of Research

For the major causes of very preterm birth, this study will determine whether there are inter-institutional variations in maternal or perinatal outcomes that can be accounted for by variability in obstetric practice, after correction for differences in patient mix. This information will be used to improve outcomes (for both mothers and babies) and reduce costs, by targeting practices for trials of effectiveness.
This project will also form the basis of the Canadian Perinatal Network (CPN), one of a number of national networks designed to cover maternal, fetal, newborn and paediatric health. Data collection for CPN will be linked to the Canadian Neonatal Network (CNN) that has been an effective vehicle for both the generation of new knowledge, and the translation of existing knowledge into clinical practice.
Funding for CPN has been provided by CIHR (2002–8, Neonatal-perinatal Interdisciplinary Capacity Enhancement Grant and 2005–2009 Operating Grant) and the MSFHR (2003–8, through the Centre for Health Innovation and Improvement, Child and Family Research Institute of British Columbia).

Links to other networks
Upon its creation, CPN was not designed to "reinvent the wheel"; rather, it capitalizes on infrastructure and definitions from existing perinatal and neonatal databases.  It was noted that this network should be created with collaboration and convergence of data in mind, in particular with other well-established national networks like the Canadian Neonatal Network (CNN) and the Canadian Perinatal Surgery Network (CAPSNet) through the Maternal-Infant Care Network (MICare).  In particular, babies identified by CPN as NICU (Neonatal Intensive Care Unit) babies will be linked to the CPN database via the infant's CNN identification number – a link that provides the unique opportunity for researchers to participate in collaborative projects on a national scale and trace effects all the way from pregnancy to pediatric health.

In creating the definition for CPN's data fields, it was clear that there is no standardization in the published literature for most obstetric or neonatal terms in common use. For example, perinatal mortality is defined differently by reproductive care programs in Canadian provinces (e.g., WHO definition by birth at ≥28 weeks versus birth at ≥20 weeks or ≥500g). Furthermore, what constitutes reduced biological growth potential is variably defined, ranging from birth weight <2500g, to birth weight <3rd percentile for gestational age and gender.  With future convergence in mind, CPN terminology was not created independently; rather, it was drawn from the proposed Canadian Perinatal Programs Coalition Minimal Dataset and the CNN database manual.

Links to publications
On behalf of the Canadian Perinatal Network Collaborative Group the following are preliminary publications including topics such as knowledge translation, sharing data, standardization of terminology, etc. Please stay tuned for more publications to come.
Massey KA, Magee LA, Dale S, Claydon J, Morris TJ, von Dadelszen P, Liston RM and Ansermino JM. A Current Landscape of Provincial Perinatal Data Collection in Canada. Journal of Obstetrics and Gynaecology of Canada. March 2009.
Massey KA, Morris TJ, Liston RM, von Dadelszen P, Ansermino JM, and Magee LA "Building Knowledge in Maternal and Infant care" in Medical Informatics in Obstetrics and Gynecology. Edited by David Parry and Emma Parry. Auckland New Zealand  November 2008.
Massey KA, Ansermino JM von Dadelszen P, Morris TJ, Liston RM, Magee LA. What is SNOMED CT and why should the ISSHP care? Hypertension in Pregnancy. February 2009.

References

External links
CPN website www.cpn-rpc.org

Medical and health organizations based in Canada